Jan Sosniok (born 14 March 1968 in Gummersbach) is a German actor.

His career began with a role in the German TV soap opera Gute Zeiten, schlechte Zeiten. Sosniok plays in TV-films and sometimes takes theatre-roles. 
He is well known for his role in the television series Berlin, Berlin as Sven.

Filmography

Theatre
 2006: Die Erbin, Neue Schaubühne München as Morris Townsend

Television

TV series
 1994–1996: Gute Zeiten, schlechte Zeiten, as Thomas Lehmann
 1999: Alarm für Cobra 11 – Die Autobahnpolizei, as Bernd Tulbeck
 2000: Das Traumschiff, as Andreas
 2000: Küstenwache, as Erik Lorenzen
 2001: Der Ermittler, as Jürgen Haffner
 2002: Einsatz Mord – Kommissarin Fleming und der Mord vor der Kamera, as Wolf
 2002-2005: Berlin, Berlin, as Sven Ehlers
 2008: Türkisch für Anfänger, as Vladi
 2010-2014: Danni Lowinski, as Dr. Oliver Schmidt

TV films
 2000: Sascha, as Ferdinand Keppler
 2002: Das beste Stück, as Mark Demski
 2004: Das allerbeste Stück, as Mark Demski
 2004: Liebe ohne Rückfahrschein, as Martin Hansen
 2005: Vollgas – Gebremst wird später, as Ben Klinger
 2005: Macho im Schleudergang, as Tom
 2006: Verschleppt – Kein Weg zurück, as Sascha
 2006: Wiedersehen am Fluss (Rosamunde Pilcher), as Robert
 2007: Die ProSieben Märchenstunde – Die Prinzessin auf der Erbse, as Prinz Herold

Film
 2005: Siegfried, as König Gunther

External links

 Official site  
 

1968 births
Living people
German male film actors
German male stage actors
German male television actors